Samuel James Long (born 12 November 2002) is an English born Scottish professional footballer who plays as a goalkeeper on loan for Bromley from Lincoln City.

Club career

Lincoln City
Long signed his first professional contract on 1 October 2020. He would make his Lincoln City debut against Manchester United U21 in the EFL Trophy on 24 August 2021. On 21 October 2021, Long would join Gainsborough Trinity on loan until January 2022. His loan was cut short on 6 November 2021 and would return to play for his parent club in the FA Cup. On 30 December 2021, Long signed a new long-term contract until June 2025. He made his league debut on 22 January 2022, against Plymouth Argyle following an injury to regular number one, Josh Griffiths. A few days later he would join Drogheda United on loan for their upcoming 2022 season. He would return from his loan spell on 16 June 2022, following 15 appearances, keeping three clean sheets. On 20 July 2022, Long joined Boston United on loan. He was recalled from his season loan on 13 January 2023. On 31 January 2023, he was sent on loan again, this time to Bromley.

International career
He was called up to the England Men's Goalkeeping Development Camp at St George's Park in April 2021. On 18 March 2022, he was called up to the Scotland U21 side.

Career statistics

References 

Living people
Lincoln City F.C. players
Gainsborough Trinity F.C. players
Drogheda United F.C. players
Boston United F.C. players
Bromley F.C. players
Association football goalkeepers
2002 births
English footballers
Northern Premier League players
English Football League players
League of Ireland players
Expatriate association footballers in the Republic of Ireland
English people of Scottish descent